The 13th New Zealand Parliament was a term of the New Zealand Parliament. It was elected at the 1896 general election in December of that year.

1896 general election

The 1896 general election was held on Wednesday, 4 December in the general electorates and on Thursday, 19 December in the Māori electorates, respectively. In the 1896 electoral redistribution, rapid population growth in the North Island required the transfer of three seats from the South Island to the north. Four electorates that previously existed were re-established (and ), and three electorates were established for the first time (and ). A total of 74 MPs were elected; 34 represented North Island electorates, 36 represented South Island electorates, and the remaining four represented Māori electorates.  337,024 voters were enrolled and the official turnout at the election was 76.1%.

Sessions
The 13th Parliament sat for four sessions (there were two sessions in 1897), and was prorogued on 15 November 1899.

Overview of seats

Ministries
The Liberal Government of New Zealand had taken office on 24 January 1891.  The Seddon Ministry under Richard Seddon had taken office in 1893 during the term of the 11th Parliament.  The Seddon Ministry remained in power for the whole term of this Parliament and held power until Seddon's death on 10 June 1906.

Initial composition of the 13th Parliament

By-elections during 13th Parliament
There were a number of changes during the term of the 13th Parliament.

Notes

References

13